The 2005 Northeast Conference baseball tournament began on May 20 and ended on May 23, 2005, at FirstEnergy Park in Lakewood, New Jersey.  The league's top four teams competed in the double elimination tournament.  Top-seeded  won their first tournament championship and earned the Northeast Conference's automatic bid to the 2005 NCAA Division I baseball tournament.

Seeding and format
The top four finishers were seeded one through four based on conference regular-season winning percentage.

Bracket

Most Valuable Player
Ryan Rizzo of Quinnipiac was named Tournament Most Valuable Player.  Rizzo, a sophomore, hit safely 11 times in 20 at-bats (.550) with three doubles and three RBI for the tournament.

References

Tournament
Northeast Conference Baseball Tournament
Northeast Conference baseball tournament
Northeast Conference baseball tournament